The Kachabia (in Arabic: قشابية; in chaoui: ⵀⵇⵛⴰⴱⵉⵜ, haqechabiṯ, هَقَشَّبِيثْ) also called Kachabiya or kchabia is a traditional Algerian Berber clothing.

Description 

It is a long brown garment with a hood that is comparable to the djellaba but considerably thicker. Kachabia is made of pure wool or wbar (camel hair). This outfit is from the region of Djelfa of central Algeria. It is particularly popular among residents of Algeria's central and eastern semi-arid areas (Ammi Moussa, Relizane, Chlef, Djelfa, M'sila, Aurès, Biskra, Bou-Saada ...).

It is part of the outfits worn by the Chaoui people and was subsequently exported throughout the country and even crossed borders to neighboring countries. Modern Kachabia come in a variety of colors and designs and may be worn by both men and women, despite the fact that it is still considered a masculine outfit.

References

Algerian clothing
Moroccan clothing
Robes and cloaks